Pragatisheel India Congress (PIC) was a political party in India that was formed by  Somendra Nath Mitra.  In July 2008, Somendra Nath Mitra left the Indian National Congress and formed a new party, named, Pragatisheel Indira Congress. In October 2009, the party was officially merged with the All India Trinamool Congress.

See also 
Indian National Congress breakaway parties
Indian National Congress (R)

References

State political parties in West Bengal
Trinamool Congress
Anti-communism in India
Indian National Congress breakaway groups
Political parties in India
2008 establishments in West Bengal
Political parties established in 2008